Sebastian Castello (born October 8, 2003) is a Canadian professional soccer player who plays for Forge FC of the Canadian Premier League.

Early life
Castello began his career with the RVDL Lions, created by former Dutch player Robin van der Laan, before later joining Sigma FC.

Career
On July 30, 2021 Forge FC announced the signing of Castello to a developmental deal. That same day he made his professional debut for Forge against York United, entering as a substitute for Tristan Borges in an eventual 1–0 victory. In addition to his contract with Forge he also suited up for their League1 Ontario affiliate, Sigma FC, and made his debut in their opening weekend victory over ProStars FC on July 31, netting a goal in a 3–1 victory. On October 30, Castello scored his first goal for Forge, scoring the final goal in a 4–1 victory over the HFX Wanderers.

In February 2022, Forge announced they had re-signed Castello ahead of the upcoming season.

International career
In December 2022, Castello received a call to join a camp with the Canada national futsal team.

References

2003 births
Living people
Association football midfielders
Canadian soccer players
Soccer players from Mississauga
Forge FC players
League1 Ontario players
Canadian Premier League players
Sigma FC players